The Portuguese Women's Basketball League Cup (Taça da Liga de Basquetebol Feminino) is a women's basketball competition organized by the Portuguese Basketball Federation.

Portuguese League Cup winners

References

External links
 History

Women's basketball cup competitions in Portugal
Liga Feminina de Basquetebol
Portugal